Robert Hale Ives Goddard III (born 1941) is a linguist and a curator emeritus in the Department of Anthropology of the National Museum of Natural History at the Smithsonian Institution. He is widely considered the leading expert on the Algonquian languages and the larger Algic language family.

Early life and education
Goddard received his B.A. from Harvard College in 1963 and his Ph.D. from Harvard University in 1969. From 1966–1969 he was a junior fellow of the Harvard Society of Fellows.

Career
After earning his doctorate, Goddard taught for several years at Harvard as a junior professor.

In 1975, he moved to the Smithsonian Institution. His own field research in linguistics has concentrated on the Delaware languages and Meskwaki (Fox). He is also known for work on the Algonquian Massachusett language, and the history of the Cheyenne language. He has also published on the history of the Arapahoan branch of Algonquian: its two current lines that are extant are Arapaho and Gros Ventre, spoken by tribal members in the West.

Goddard is a prominent figure in the study of the methodology of historical linguistics. He has played a significant role in critiquing crank historical linguistic work.

He is the linguistic and technical editor of the Handbook of North American Indians.

Awards

 He received the Kenneth L. Hale Award from the LSA in 2002.
 Goddard and Thomas Love received the Joel Palmer Award in 2005 for their article "Oregon the Beautiful".

Publications
  Kiyana, Alfred. (2022) Masahkamikohkwêwa (Grandmother Earth), Thomason, Lucy G. and Goddard, Ives, editors. Petoskey, Michigan: Mundart Press. ISBN 9798986545004

References

External links
 Ives Goddard homepage, National Museum of Natural History
 Department of Anthropology, National Museum of Natural History, Smithsonian Institution
 Harvard Society of Fellows

Linguists from the United States
Historical linguists
Harvard College alumni
Harvard University faculty
Living people
1941 births
Smithsonian Institution people
Linguists of Algic languages
Linguists of Muskogean languages
Linguists of Uto-Aztecan languages
20th-century linguists
21st-century linguists
Fellows of the Linguistic Society of America